The IWA Undisputed World Heavyweight Championship is a professional wrestling world heavyweight championship that is contested in the International Wrestling Association's main branch at Puerto Rico. Besides its base jurisdiction, the title has also been defended within the international circuit and interpromotially at Frontier Martial-Arts Wrestling (Japan) and Revolution X-treme Wrestling (Panama).

The championship was established in 2000, changing its name eight years later to reflect the status of undisputed championship that the National Wrestling Alliance recognized following a controversial "unification" match where (another title born with the NWA as sanctioning body) the WWC Universal Heavyweight Championship was purportedly on the line. When reintroduced in 2018, this distinction had been dropped from the name.

In 2021, Fernando Tonos and Manny Ferno created a group known as La Alianza IWE with the intention of completing a hostile takeover on behalf of International Wrestling Entertainment. Members of the stable won all of the IWA-PR titles. In response, general manager Chicky Starr and Savio Vega introduced parallel titles for each division in March 2022. While the storyline continued, there was a pair of belts contested independently of each other, with the original being referenced to as the "IWE World Heavyweight Championship". On November 19, 2022, John Hawking defeated Mr. Big to unify both titles, reintroducing the name "IWA Undisputed World Heavyweight Championship".

History

Unification with the "Capitol World Heavyweight Championship"
On December 15, 2007, Scott Hall failed to attend a titular defense which led to the fictional local boxing and wrestling commission's decision to vacate the WWC Universal Heavyweight Championship and award it to the number one contender who at the moment was Miguel "Biggie Size" Maldonado. On December 30, the Universal Heavyweight Championship was declared vacant following the events where he was declared the champion following Hall's absence to Lockout. The commission's decision was announced during the company's holiday recess and  Maldonado retained the championship belt in custody.

On January 6, 2008, Jack Meléndez who had been managing La Rabia, the stable where he performed abandoned the company citing differences with the company's personnel. Following Meléndez's exit from the company the stable abandoned the company no-showing the a special event scheduled for January 6, 2008. On January 6, Maldonado appeared in the IWA's Histeria Boricua event, with the championship belt still in his possession and challenged Freddie "Blitz" Lozada, who was the IWA World Heavyweight Champion to a unification match. The match took place later in the event with Lozada winning both belts. Following this match WWC's merchandising manager, José Roberto Rodríguez, who had been allowed entry into the building, demanded that the belt was returned to him, but at the moment the IWA's personnel had replaced the belt with Revolution X-Treme Wrestling's championship belt (at the moment in Savio Vega's possession) and had transferred the Universal Heavyweight Championship to a secure location, which led to a discussion between personnel from both companies and Rodríguez's expulsion from the event. After the event's conclusion police officers were deployed and the IWA retained physical possession of the championship. Following this the belt was returned to WWC personnel following an ultimatum, which claimed that the company would take legal action if it wasn't returned within forty-eight hours. However, both the International Wrestling Association and the National Wrestling Alliance recognized the unification match, and considered Lozada the first Undisputed World Heavyweight Champion in Puerto Rico.

International exposure
Beginning in 2009, the IWA Undisputed World Unified Heavyweight Championship began becoming involved in several inter-promotional "champion vs. champion" contests. The first of these took place on January 6, 2009, where Carlos "Chicano" Cotto was booked to defend the title against Total Nonstop Action Wrestling's Legends Champion, Booker T. The contest was part of an annual event titled "Histeria Boricua". The conclusion came when Cotto inverted a "Book End" attempt, scoring a pinfall victory. On February 14, 2009, the promotion held a special event named "Noche de Campeónes". In this card, Cotto defended the championship against Samoa Joe. During the final stages of the fight, Noel Rodríguez  intervened, injuring the referee. Both wrestlers continued performing, with Cotto scoring a pinfall victory after reverting a finisher and receiving the count from a substitute referee. On April 18, 2009, Cotto was challenged to an unification contest by Joe Bravo, who held the DWE Dominican National Championship, the major title of Dominican Wrestling Entertainment based in the Dominican Republic. Bravo won with the help of a heel referee, becoming a dual champion. The next titleholder to challenge for the belt was Jerry Lynn, Ring of Honor's World Champion, who unsuccessfully competed against Bravo and Chicano in a three-way match. This was part of the "Juicio Final 2009" card. On May 29, 2009, Bravo defended the IWA and DWE championships in Panama, defeating El Cuervo as part of a Revolution X-Treme Wrestling card. On November 1, 2009, Bravo and the incumbent WWC Universal Heavyweight Champion, Shane Sewell, performed in a DWE event, with the DWE Dominican National Championship being held up after the creative team booked a no contest. This marked the first instance that the two major champions worked together while holding full recognitions by both promotions.

IWA vs. EWO, Clash of the Titans
At Summer Attitude 2011, Chris Angel defeated Hiram Tua to become the first undefeated Undisputed World Champion. He went on to defeat all contenders, one of them being Cotto, who was subsequently fired by Pérez after questioning his involvement in a match between both. This event launched a storyline between the IWA and the Extreme Wrestling Organization, the largest independent company and de facto third main promotion in Puerto Rico. On December 17, 2011, Cotto won the EWO Championship, only to be interrupted by Pérez. This was in response to a previous confrontation between both, that occurred following an unrelated charity card. After defending the title at Tierra de Nadie 2012, Pérez once again reclaimed his contract. At Histeria Boricua, Angel was absent for a scheduled defense due to a storyline injury, which resulted in the title being stripped from him. The interim General Manager went on to proclaim himself champion, issuing an open challenge which was accepted by EWO's first contender, a masked wrestler known only as "Bonecrusher", who won it Ina squash match. The confrontations between Cotto and Pérez continued in two of IWA's events expanding to include EWO's CEO, Richard Rondón, as well. On February 25, 2012, following more intervention from the IWA, Cotto issued a challenge to end the conflict, an unification match for the EWO Championship and IWA Undisputed World Heavyweight Championship. On March 1, 2012, the challenge was accepted by Pérez and Rondón in a backstage segment. At Clash of the Titans, Bonecrusher defeated Cotto, becoming Unified Champion. In 2012, IWA folded, so the title was vacated.

During the following years, the Undisputed World Heavyweight Championship made appearances in a number of unrelated media. In early 2015, while Vega was part of La Radio PR's Más Allá del Ring show, the title made appearances as part of the studio's decore along the Intercontinental and World Tag Team Championships. In autumn, the IWA Undisputed World Heavyweight Championship was taken to New York during Amaro Productions' La Guerra 2 event. In an interview published on October 22, 2015, wrestling journalist Joel Torres reunited Ricky Banderas with the belt, with the wrestler reminiscing about winning it in Juicio Final 2001 and emphasized on the history that the title had. The title was also featured at the 2016 WrestleCon held at Dallas, with Vega posing with it in fan requests and while being reunited with Miguel Pérez.

Revival, pandemic hiatus (2019–2021)
The title was formally reactivated on April 20, 2018, initially scheduled to be contested in a charity card held in benefit of Gustavo Rodríguez, a former member of the IWA's ring crew and Hardcore Champion. The contenders were to be elected by Savio Vega and Miguel Pérez, with the former choosing Monster Pain as his representative. Hours later, the return of the IWA was teased as part of World Wrestling League's (up to that point the promotion's spiritual successor) version of Juicio Final. However, internal differences within the interpromotional event lead to the cancellation of the Luchando por Gustavo titular match the following day, leaving the title vacant. The IWA trademark was formally reintroduced on May 6, 2018. The Undisputed World Heavyweight Championship (along the Intercontinental and World Tag Team belts) was featured in the promotion for Golpe de Estado 2018, where the main storyline revolved around Vega's intention of renaming WWL.

Vega carried the belt with him at Golpe de Estado, and in subsequent charity events. On July 20, 2018, a relaunch of IWA's Florida spinoff was also announced, along a tournament to fill the vacancies for the Undisputed World Heavyweight and World Tag Team Championships. However, the formal reactivation of IWA-PR led to the reassignment for the second date of Impacto Total: El Tour, where it would be disputed in a four-way match. On its part, IWA Florida received its own version of the Heavyweight Championship (which kept the original design minus minor alterations and not making a claim of "world" status) which longtime rival headliner Carly Colón appropriated following a match with Mechawolf 450 as part of Histeria Boricua 2019.

The crowning of a new champion became part of the return tour's main storyline. First in a segment where Savio Vega noted that it was his dream to restage the ambienance of October 28, 2000. This led to Director of Talent Relations, Dennis Rivera, granting the Puro Macho stable leader, Manny Ferno, the opportunity to elect only one of its members for a place in the titular match (intending to create division in retribution for the WWL feud). The latter would meet with Mr. Big, who had served a mercenary role for the faction and requested the reassurance that he would not be joining his old IWA team of Los Rabiosos, only to receive a demand for a title shot in exchange for allegiance. Savio Vega was noted to be skeptical of allowing Puro Macho a chance to gather influence within the promotion, but was reassured by Rivera that the ambitions would create irreparable damage. Meanwhile, members of Puro Macho Electro and Khriz "The Chosen" held a meeting in which the former noted his interest in the accolade, later informing Ferno of this stance.

Shane Sewell was the first contender announced, but resigned his place to Mr. Big, betting that he still remained loyal to the IWA. Former champions Ricky Banderas and Apolo were announced as the other two. Ultimately, Ferno acknowledged that the decision would be problematic and refused to elect a member, allowing Rivera to choose Electro in his stead. As the youngest of the group the latter would emerge victorious, continuing the IWA's philosophy of building a "new generation" with the collaboration of veterans. After CWA World Heavyweight Champion Noel Rodríguez made an appearance and issued a challenge at Vendetta, Electro had a defense against him in that promotion's Sabotaje event.

After being given the title for the first time in 14 years, Mikael Judas started defending it abroad, beginning with a successful defense at Tennessee. Another appearance for Continental Championship Wrestling of Georgia, in which he was announced as the "Puerto Rico World Champion". On November 30, 2019, Mr. Big defeated Judas at Hardcore Weekend. Benefited by the COVID-19 pandemic, he entered the longest reign of any wrestler, scoring a number of defenses that aired in events without public.

Major League Wrestling and IWE Takeover (2021–present)
On July 31, 2021, former Caribbean Heavyweight Champion and Major League Wrestling (MLW) regular Richard Holliday made his debut for IWA-PR by defeating Mr. Big for the World Heavyweight Championship. After some titles changes, Fernando Tonos reveal he got in his power a book property of Victor Quiñones with "work plans" using it to create the IWE and take control of all titles with intentions of close IWA and renamed. After Juicio Final 2022, the company got 2 champions on all divisions due to controversy between IWE & IWA.

Belt design
The IWA World Heavyweight Championship belt originally consisted of five gilded circular plaques placed on a black belt. The main plate featured a mapamundi at the center, flanged by eleven flags (Puerto Rico, Japan, Brazil, Canada, Australia, Colombia, Italy, South Korea, Mexico, United States and the Pan-African flag) and the words "World Heavyweight Wrestling Champion", and "IWA" prominently at the crown. The interior set of side plaques depict wrestlers grappling and the outside set is dominated by another, single-circle, world map. All of the secondary plates are crowned by the corporate acronym. The piece was crafted and designed by Reggie Parks, who had manufactured titles for the World Wrestling Federation (WWF, now known as WWE) and other international companies.

Its original colors included light-blue on the globes and black on the company acronym. In subsequent retouches, the underlying chrome base was evident, the blue coloration was darkened, "IWA" was recolored red throughout, the Pan-African flag was changed twice (first to that of Venezuela and later Germany) and the flag of Italy was switched with France's. In 2018, Collection Spot was commissioned to restore the IWA World Heavyweight Championship, adding to the work previously done by Rolando Martínez. Besides retouching the colors, reinstating the Italian flag and restoring the black to "IWA" throughout, the process involved adding gold to the mantling of the plates and painting their studs blue.

In 2022, IWA-PR commissioned new belts for all divisions from Collection Spot as part of revamp for its 20th Anniversary. The IWA World Heavyweight Championship retained the original Reggie Parks design, but was enlarged and the blue shade of the mapamundi reverted to a lighter shade of blue. Instead of being etched intaglio as in the original design, the "IWA" logo is now flat and silver-colored. Meanwhile, the original belt was repurposed as the IWE World Heavyweight Championship with a sticker of the stable’s logo being placed over the "IWA" in the crown of the center plate.

Title history

Combined Reigns

References

External links
IWA's Official Site
Wrestling-titles.com

International Wrestling Association (Puerto Rico) championships
World heavyweight wrestling championships